Legislative elections for the Territorial Council were held in Saint Pierre and Miquelon on 19 March 2000.  A second round of voting was held on 26 March.  They were won by the alliance of Rally for Construction and Saint Pierre and Miquelon 2000, which took 12 of the 19 seats.

Results 

2000 in Saint Pierre and Miquelon
2000 elections in North America
Elections in Saint Pierre and Miquelon
Election and referendum articles with incomplete results